The SP-8 is an electro-pneumatic paintball marker manufactured by Smart Parts.  It is the company's first attempt at a milsim marker, which are popular among scenario paintball players.  Mechanically, the SP-8 is very similar to the popular Smart Parts Ion, but the body is modeled after the Heckler & Koch XM8 Assault Rifle.

Features on the SP-8 include break beam eyes, high capacity solenoid, electronic double-finger trigger, and military style accessory rails, which can be used to mount sights, tactical lights, bipods, and other accessories.  First party after market upgrades include a 7-point collapsible stock, extended suppressed "stealth" barrel, and multi-mode Blackheart circuit board.  Additional third party upgrades are also available.  The SP-8 is also available in four color combinations: Jungle (Olive/Black), Desert (Tan/Black), Urban (Gray/Black) and Night Ops (Black).

Preproduction SP-8 units shipped in an unmarked carton with a standard Ion manual. Production first-generation SP-8s had their own manual; they shipped with standard Ion grips and a split-tip barrel that (from the front) formed the Smart Parts logo but which was prone to bending if jammed into the ground. Subsequent SP-8s used wraparound grips unique to the SP8 and had a more traditional muzzle-break barrel.

SP-8 internals are identical to those of an Ion, with a few minor differences. First, the SP-8's regulator is canted 15 degrees forward; the Ion's is vertical. The SP-8's pressure gauge is mounted on the right, unlike the Ion (and almost all other markers) which has the gauge on the left. The SP-8 ships with a straight "blade" trigger, while the Ion has a curved "wave" trigger. Finally, the SP-8's breech section is drilled for a right-hand feed tube (so that top-mounted accessories such as scopes will not be blocked by the feed tube or hopper), while the Ion is set up for traditional vertical feed. The SP-8 is thus forced to use a plastic 45-degree elbow adapter to mount a hopper, which (because it is prone to frequent breakage) is a criticized feature. The Ion, by contrast, has a threaded vertical feed port that accepts all standard Impulse-threaded feednecks. Aftermarket adapters have been released that allow the SP-8 to use the same Impulse-threaded feednecks as the Ion while eliminating the plastic elbow.

Due to the market success of the SP-8, Smart Parts released a second milsim marker, the SP-1, in late 2007.  The SP-1 is a more basic electronic marker, with a more traditional body, a tension-based anti chop system instead of break beam eyes, and a lighter price tag to appeal to more players.

External links
Manufacturer's Website

Paintball markers